Svetlana Vasilyevna Khorkina (born 19 January 1979) is a retired Russian artistic gymnast. She competed at the 1996 Summer Olympics, the 2000 Summer Olympics, and the 2004 Summer Olympics. During her career, Khorkina won seven Olympic medals and twenty World Championship medals. Over time, she medaled in every event at the World Artistic Gymnastics Championships.  She was also the first gymnast to win three all-around titles at the World Championships and only the second female artistic gymnast ever, after Nadia Comăneci, to win three European All-Around titles.  Khorkina is regarded as one of the most successful female gymnasts of all time.

At the opening ceremony of the 2019 Winter Universiade she lit the fire, together with bandy player Sergey Lomanov.

Senior career

1994–1996 
In April 1994, Khorkina competed at the World Championships in Brisbane, Australia. She placed ninth in the all around with a score of 38.805. In the event finals, she placed second on vault scoring 9.800, second on uneven bars scoring 9.875, and eighth on floor scoring 8.487. In November 1994, Khorkina competed at the World Team Championships in Dortmund, Germany.  She contributed an all-around score of 39.450 toward the Russian team's third-place finish.

In October 1995, Khorkina competed at the World Championships in Sabae, Japan. In the all around final, she placed second with a score of 39.130. In the event finals, she placed fifth on vault scoring 9.618 and first on uneven bars scoring 9.900. In April 1996, Khorkina competed at the World Championships in San Juan, Puerto Rico. She placed fifth on vault scoring 9.637 and first on uneven bars scoring 9.787. In May 1996, Khorkina competed at the European Championships in Birmingham, United Kingdom. She helped Russia win the silver medal in the team final and came sixth in the all around final with a score of 38.549. In the event finals, she placed fourth on vault scoring 9.725 and first on uneven bars scoring 9.825.

Atlanta Olympics (1996)
Khorkina competed at the 1996 Summer Olympics in Atlanta, United States. In the team final, she contributed a combined compulsory and optional score of 77.648 toward the Russian team's second-place finish. In the all-around final, she fell on the uneven bars in the final rotation and finished fifteenth in the standings with a total score of 38.455. Three days later, Khorkina redeemed herself by winning the gold medal in the uneven bars final with a score of 9.850.

1997–2000 
In September 1997, Khorkina competed at the World Championships in Lausanne, Switzerland. She helped Russia place second in the team final and individually she won the all around final with a score of 38.636.  In event finals, she placed eighth on vault scoring 4.537, first on uneven bars scoring 9.875, second on balance beam scoring 9.787, and second on floor scoring 9.800. In November 1997, Khorkina caused a scandal by posing for the Russian edition of Playboy. She said, "I changed people's attitudes.  It's very good to be sexy. My career made it clear that tall girls can do incredible things. I opened the way. Now I'm famous all over the world".

In May 1998, Khorkina competed at the European Championships in St. Petersburg, Russia. She helped the Russian team finish second and individually she won the all around final with a score of 38.624. In event finals, she placed first on uneven bars scoring 9.900 and first on floor scoring 9.787.

In October 1999, Khorkina competed at the World Championships in Tianjin, China. She helped Russia place second in the team final and individually she placed twelfth in the all around final with a score of 37.611. In event finals, she placed first on uneven bars scoring 9.837 and third on floor scoring 9.787. In May 2000, Khorkina competed at the European Championships in Paris, France. She helped the Russian team win the gold medal and individually she won the all around final with a score of 38.749. In event finals, she placed first on uneven bars scoring 9.837 and first on balance beam scoring 9.837.

Sydney Olympics (2000) 
In September, Khorkina competed at the 2000 Summer Olympics in Sydney, Australia. In qualifications, the Russian team placed first and individually Khorkina placed first in the all around with a score of 39.005.  She also qualified for the vault, uneven bars, and floor event finals. In the team final, Khorkina contributed an all-around score of 38.261 toward the Russian team's second-place finish.

In the all around final, Khorkina placed tenth with a score of 37.929. During the final the vault was set five centimeters lower than it should have been, causing many gymnasts, including Khorkina, to fall. Subsequently, she fell on the uneven bars for unrelated reasons. In the third rotation the vault height was corrected. The gymnasts who had already vaulted were invited to vault again, but Khorkina refused, knowing that it would not put her in medal contention.

In the event finals, Khorkina gave up her spot in the vault final to teammate, Elena Zamolodchikova, who went on to win the gold medal. Khorkina said, "I thought she could win the gold. I'm glad I could give her that opportunity." She then won the uneven bars final with a score of 9.862. She became the second gymnast to win the event in two consecutive Olympic games after Polina Astakhova who won in 1960 and 1964. Commenting on the all-around final, Khorkina said, "If I didn't get over the disappointment, I wouldn't be Khorkina. I wouldn't be standing here with the gold medal. It still hurts a lot. It was cruel to all the participants, to vault on a nonstandard height. It's quite possible to get killed. The five centimeters could decide the future of a sportsperson. But I was fortunate to have many people to help me get through it. Tomorrow, I will dance for Russia. I will leave what happened on the vault far behind me, like the North Pole." She then won the silver medal in the floor final with a score of 9.812, upstaged again by Zamolodchikova who scored a 9.850.

2001–2004 
In October 2001, Khorkina competed at the World Championships in Ghent, Belgium. She helped the Russian team win the silver medal and individually she won the all around final with a score of 37.617.  In event finals, she placed first on vault scoring 9.412, first on uneven bars scoring 9.437, and third on floor scoring 9.375. In April 2002, Khorkina competed at the European Championships in Patras, Greece. She helped Russia win the first place in the team competition and individually she won the all around competition with a score of 37.592. In event finals, she placed first on uneven bars scoring 9.550, second on balance beam scoring 9.262, and fifth on floor scoring 9.075.

In November 2002, Khorkina competed at the World Championships in Debrecen, Hungary. She placed seventh on uneven bars scoring 7.387 and fourth on balance beam scoring 9.462.

In March 2003, Khorkina competed at the World Cup event in Thessaloniki, Greece. She placed first on uneven bars scoring 9.425. In August 2003, Khorkina competed at the World Championships in Anaheim, United States. She won the all around final for with a score of 38.124 This was the first time a gymnast had won three World all around titles. In November 2003, Khorkina competed at the World Cup event in Stuttgart, Germany. She placed third on vault scoring 9.268, third on uneven bars scoring 9.425, third on balance beam scoring 9.225, and second on floor scoring 9.187.

At the end of April 2004, Khorkina competed at the European Championships in Amsterdam, The Netherlands. She helped the Russian team place third and individually she placed fourth in the all around final with a score of 36.848. In event finals, she placed first on uneven bars scoring 9.662, third on balance beam scoring 9.325, and seventh on floor scoring 9.112.

Athens Olympics (2004) 
In August, Khorkina competed at the 2004 Summer Olympics in Athens, Greece. In the team final, she contributed an all around score of 38.062 toward the Russian team's third-place finish.  In the all around final, she won the silver medal with a score of 38.211.

Khorkina qualified in first place for the Uneven Bars Final, with a score of 9.750. However, she placed eighth in the uneven bars final with a score of 8.925 after turning late on a pirouette and coming off the apparatus. This meant that she failed to defend her two-time Olympic uneven bars title from the 1996 and 2000 Summer Olympics with the title going to Émilie Le Pennec of France instead.

Eponymous skills
Khorkina has 4 eponymous skills that are currently listed in the Code of Points (CoP). Prior to the 2022–2024 quad, she held the record of having the most eponyms at 9 before some easier ones were removed as part of CoP's regular update.

Personal life 

Svetlana Khorkina was born on 19 January 1979, the daughter of Vasiliy and Lyubov. She has a younger sister, Yulia, who was also a gymnast. Khorkina said, "As a child, I was very picky with my food. My mother hoped, that if she puts me into gymnastics, I would start eating breakfast without frowning, after having spent a lot of energy in the gym. This is how, by simple nutritional reasons, I started my gymnastics career at the age of four."

At 5'5", most people thought that Khorkina was too tall to be an artistic gymnast. However, her coach, Boris Pilkin, saw her potential and created alternative training methods and skills to accommodate her taller body. Khorkina has more skills named after her in the Code of Points than any other gymnast.

Khorkina was known for her dramatic and opinionated personality, often being called a diva. She said, "I wouldn't have been called a diva or a queen if I wasn't creative.  My costume and make-up were always important to me. When people come to see gymnastics they want a performance, not just a sport. I have a talent. I have accomplished so much in sport it will take dozens of years before anyone else achieves as much".

After retiring from gymnastics, in December 2005 Khorkina was named vice-president of the Russian Artistic Gymnastics Federation. In 2008, she was a commentator for the Beijing Olympics' gymnastics competition for the Russian TV station NTV+ and released her autobiography entitled, "Somersaults in High Heels" published by Olma-Press She was also an ambassador for the 2014 Winter Olympics in Sochi, Russia. Khorkina has been a member of the political party of United Russia since 2003. She was elected as a deputy for the Russian State Duma in 2007 and served until 2011.

In July 2005, Khorkina gave birth to a son, Svyatoslav Khorkin, at Cedars-Sinai Medical Center in Los Angeles, United States but refused to name the father of the child. The father was later revealed to be businessman Kirill Shubsky, who was married to actress and film director Vera Glagoleva. In April 2011, Khorkina married Oleg Kochnev. He is a former general in Russia's Federal Security Service and 23 years her senior. Khorkina and Kochnev have a son, Ivan, born in October 2019.

Political views
In March 2022, during the Russian invasion of Ukraine, Khorkina posted an image of the 'Z' military symbol which is commonly used by Russian invading forces in Ukraine, with the comment, "A campaign for those who are not ashamed of being Russian. Let's spread it!"

Competitive history

†1998 Goodwill Games: mixed pairs silver medal with Alexei Nemov.

See also
List of Olympic female gymnasts for Russia
List of top Olympic gymnastics medalists
List of top medalists at the World Artistic Gymnastics Championships

References

External links
 
 
 
 Khorkina (Uneven Bars animation)

1979 births
Russian female artistic gymnasts
Living people
Gymnasts at the 1996 Summer Olympics
Gymnasts at the 2000 Summer Olympics
Gymnasts at the 2004 Summer Olympics
Olympic gold medalists for Russia
Olympic silver medalists for Russia
Olympic bronze medalists for Russia
Olympic gymnasts of Russia
Originators of elements in artistic gymnastics
World champion gymnasts
Medalists at the World Artistic Gymnastics Championships
Fifth convocation members of the State Duma (Russian Federation)
Mordvin people
People from Belgorod
United Russia politicians
21st-century Russian politicians
Olympic medalists in gymnastics
European champions in gymnastics
Medalists at the 2004 Summer Olympics
Medalists at the 2000 Summer Olympics
Medalists at the 1996 Summer Olympics
Russian sportsperson-politicians
Competitors at the 1994 Goodwill Games
Competitors at the 1998 Goodwill Games
Competitors at the 2001 Goodwill Games
Goodwill Games medalists in gymnastics
21st-century Russian women